Seoul Vibe is a 2022 South Korean action film directed by Moon Hyun-sung. Yoo Ah-in, Go Kyung-pyo, Lee Kyu-hyung, Park Ju-hyun, Ong Seong-wu, Kim Sung-kyun, Moon So-ri, and Jung Woong-in round out the ensemble cast. It was released on Netflix on August 26, 2022.

Plot 
During the leadup to the 1988 Seoul Olympic Games, a car chase takes place on the streets of Seoul as a crew of talented drivers, known as the Sangyedong Supreme team, attempts to unravel the corruption surrounding some slush funds.

Cast

Main 
 Yoo Ah-in as Park Dong-wook, the leader of Sangedong Supreme investigative team
 Go Kyung-pyo as Oh Woo-sam, the member of the investigative team who is also a DJ
 Lee Kyu-hyung as Bok-nam, the member of the investigative team who masters the city streets of Seoul 
 Park Ju-hyun as Park Yoon-hee, the younger sister of Dong-wook and leader of the biggest biker club in Seoul
 Ong Seong-wu as Joon-ki, the member of the investigative team who is also a handyman.

Supporting 
 Kim Sung-kyun as Lee Hyun-kyun, the right-hand man of Chairwoman Kang
 Jung Woong-in as Chief Prosecutor
 Moon So-ri as Kang In-sook, a very influential figure of the underground economy
 Oh Jung-se as Ahn Pyung-wook, a prosecutor
 Song Min-ho as Galchi
 Kim Chae-eun as Kim Yoon-jae, the secretary of Chairwoman Kang
 Chun-sik as Galchi's subordinate

Special appearance 
 Lee Se-young as cinema employee
 Yoon Kyung-ho as Mr. Yoon

Production 
In December 2020, it was first revealed that production company Andmarq Studio planned to produce upcoming film Seoul Vibe with actors Yoo Ah-in and Go Yoon-jung. MCMC and UAA joined the production with Netflix distributing the film.

In June 2021, Seoul Vibe confirmed production with ensemble casting of Yoo Ah-in, Go Kyung-pyo, Park Ju-hyun, Lee Kyu-hyung, Ong Seong-wu, Kim Sung-kyun, Jung Woong-in, Moon So-ri, and Song Min-ho.

Filming has begun in Eurwang-dong, Jung-gu, Incheon, in August 2021. It was halted twice in August and November 2021 due to the film staff's and Go Kyung-pyo's COVID-19 tests came out positive, and resumed filming in December 2021.

Release
Seoul Vibe was released on Netflix on August 26, 2022.

References

External links 
 
 
 

2022 films
Films about corruption
South Korean action films
Korean-language Netflix original films
Film productions suspended due to the COVID-19 pandemic
2020s Korean-language films
Films set in the 1980s
Films set in Seoul
Films about the 1988 Summer Olympics